Samart I-Mobile Public Company Limited or simply I-Mobile is a Thai mobile phone company. It is a subsidiary of Samart Group. It is one of leading local mobile phone brands in Thailand. The company was founded in 1995 and has its headquartered in Nonthaburi, Thailand. I-Mobile smart phones run on Android OS.

I-Mobile has own shop called "i-mobile by SAMART" to distribute IT devices, mobile phones, accessories, SIM cards, and provide after sales services nationwide. In 2014, it had the fourth largest market share with 9.2 percent of mobile phones in Thailand. The current market is expanding from Thailand to overseas markets in Malaysia, Cambodia, Indonesia, Myanmar, Laos, Hong Kong, India, Bangladesh, and Sri Lanka.

In 2017, I-Mobile decided to liquidate the business after a loss for a period of 2–3 years consecutively and focusing on operating a digital business instead.

References

External links
 Official website

Thai brands
Mobile phone companies of Thailand
Companies listed on the Stock Exchange of Thailand